Aleksandrs Miezītis (6 June 1890 – c. 1946) was a Russian Empire wrestler. He competed in the featherweight event at the 1912 Summer Olympics.

References

External links
 

1890 births
1940s deaths
Olympic wrestlers from the Russian Empire
Wrestlers at the 1912 Summer Olympics
Sportspeople from Riga